Sacciolepis is a genus of plants in the grass family. Cupscale grass is a common name for plants in this genus.

They are widespread in tropical and warmer temperate regions. Many are native to Africa, with others in Asia, Australia, and the Americas.

These species are annual or perennial and may have rhizomes or stolons. The inflorescence is usually a narrow, dense panicle. They generally grow in moist habitat, such as marshes and streambanks. Sacciolepis is closely related to genus Panicum.

 Species
 Sacciolepis africana -  Africa from Senegal to KwaZulu-Natal, Madagascar
 Sacciolepis angustissima - from the Guianas to Bolivia + Peru
 Sacciolepis antsirabensis - Madagascar
 Sacciolepis arenaria - Angola
 Sacciolepis catumbensis - Angola, Zambia
 Sacciolepis chevalieri -  Africa from Senegal to KwaZulu-Natal, Madagascar
 Sacciolepis ciliocincta -  Africa from Senegal to Sudan + Congo Rep
 Sacciolepis cingularis - Sudan, Chad, Congo Rep
 Sacciolepis clatrata - Central African Rep
 Sacciolepis curvata - eastern + southeastern Africa from Kenya to KwaZulu-Natal; Madagascar, Comoros, Seychelles, Tamil Nadu, Sri Lanka
 Sacciolepis cymbiandra - West Africa from Senegal to Nigeria
 Sacciolepis fenestrata - Thailand
 Sacciolepis indica - glenwood grass, Chase's glenwood grass, Indian cupscale grass - Africa from Guinea to Cape Province; Madagascar, Comoros, Mauritius, Réunion, Indian Subcontinent, East + Southeast Asia, Australia; naturalized in New Zealand, southeastern USA, scattered places in Latin America and Pacific
 Sacciolepis interrupta - tropical Asia, tropical Africa
 Sacciolepis leptorachis - tropical Africa
 Sacciolepis micrococca - tropical Africa, Madagascar
 Sacciolepis myosuroides - tropical Africa, Madagascar, tropical Asia, Australia
 Sacciolepis myuros - tropical America from central Mexico to Trinidad + Bolivia
 Sacciolepis otachyrioides - Colombia (Meta), Venezuela (Amazonas, Apure, Guárico), Guyana (Rupununi), Bolivia (Beni, Santa Cruz), Brazil (Amazonas, Roraima)
 Sacciolepis seslerioides - Congo Rep, Zaire, Tanzania, Zambia, Angola
 Sacciolepis striata - southeastern USA from Texas to Delaware; Greater Antilles, Mexico (Veracruz, Tabasco), Central America, Trinidad, Venezuela, Guianas, Amapá
 Sacciolepis tenuissima - Thailand
 Sacciolepis transbarbata - Tanzania, Burundi, Zaire, Zambia, Angola, Malawi, Zimbabwe
 Sacciolepis typhura - Africa from Ivory Coast to Eswatini
 Sacciolepis viguieri - Madagascar
 Sacciolepis vilvoides - Cuba, South America from Venezuela to Uruguay

 formerly included
see Hymenachne Panicum 
 Sacciolepis aurita - Panicum auritum
 Sacciolepis donacifolia - Hymenachne donacifolia 
 Sacciolepis insulicola - Panicum auritum
 Sacciolepis longissima - Panicum longissimum
 Sacciolepis polymorpha - Panicum auritum
 Sacciolepis semienensis - Panicum hymeniochilum

References

Panicoideae
Poaceae genera
Grasses of Africa